Frederick F. Pordum (born 1934 ) is a Democrat US politician from Lackawanna, New York. He represented the 1st District in the Erie County Legislature from 1968 to 1971.

Pordum was sent to prison after being convicted of bribery charges in relation to a proposed dome stadium in Lancaster, New York.

References

County legislators in New York (state)
New York (state) Democrats
People from Lackawanna, New York
Living people
1934 births